Luca Pacioni (born 13 August 1993, in Gatteo) is an Italian cyclist, who currently rides for UCI ProTeam .

Major results

2014
 3rd Trofeo Città di Castelfidardo
2015
 1st Trofeo Città di Castelfidardo
 2nd Circuito del Porto
 7th Gran Premio della Liberazione
2017
 4th Overall Tour of China I
1st Stage 1
 10th Paris–Camembert
2018
 1st Stage 6 Tour de Langkawi
 1st Stage 5 Tour de Taiwan
 1st Stage 7 La Tropicale Amissa Bongo
 8th Grand Prix of Aargau Canton
2020
 1st Stage 1 Vuelta al Táchira
 6th Giro della Toscana
2021
 6th Clàssica Comunitat Valenciana 1969

References

External links
 
 
 

1993 births
Living people
Italian male cyclists
Sportspeople from the Province of Forlì-Cesena
Cyclists from Emilia-Romagna